Eitan (Hebrew for "steadfast", "firm" or "strong") is an armoured fighting vehicle (AFV) developed by the Merkava and Armored Vehicles Directorate in the IMOD to replace the aging M113 armored personnel carrier in use by the Israel Defense Forces.

Overview
The Eitan is an 8-wheeled vehicle much lighter than the Namer, weighing less than 35 tons, fitted with the Iron Fist Light Decoupled active protection system. The AFV has a top speed of 90 km/h and can carry 12 men including 3 crew. The Eitan can be equipped with a 30–40 mm gun and a missile firing position. The armor is STANAG 4569 level 4.

The Eitan will replace hundreds of M113s currently in service. According to Brigadier General Baruch Matzliah, the vehicle will complement, not replace, the Namer tracked APC; as a wheeled vehicle, it will cost half as much as the Namer and, unlike tracked vehicles, can transport infantry squads on roads without relying on tank transporters. 

The Eitan has run flat tires and is designed with a protected, relatively high floor to protect from mine and IED blast effects. The first Eitan AFV was unveiled on August 1, 2016.

See also
 Stryker
 Boxer
 Terrex ICV
 Patria AMV
 VBTP-MR Guarani

References

Armoured personnel carriers of Israel
Wheeled armoured personnel carriers
Eight-wheeled vehicles
Armoured personnel carriers of the post–Cold War period